Laaso Dawaco, also written Laz Daua, is a town in Bari, Somalia, situated  south of Bosaso, the capital city of Bari province., The town is inhabited by Dishiishe clan

References 

Populated places in Somalia